Clivina is a genus of ground beetle native to the Palearctic, the Nearctic, the Near East and North Africa.  There are more than 600 described species in Clivina.

See also
 List of Clivina species

References

External links

Clivina at Fauna Europaea

 
Scaritinae
Carabidae genera